MOVEit is a managed file transfer software produced by Ipswitch, Inc. MOVEit encrypts files and uses secure File Transfer Protocols to transfer data with automation, analytics and failover options. The software has been used in the healthcare industry by companies such as Rochester Hospital and Medibank, as well as thousands of IT departments in financial services, high technology, and government.

History
MOVEit was released in 2002 by Standard Networks. In 2006, the company released integration between MOVEit and antivirus software to stop the transfer of infected files.

Ipswitch acquired MOVEit in 2008 when the company purchased Standard Networks. MOVEit Cloud was announced in 2012 as a cloud-based file transfer management software. MOVEit Cloud was the first enterprise-class cloud managed file transfer software. It is scalable with and can share files system-to-system, group, or person-to-person.

In 2013, MOVEit clients were released for the IOS and Android platform. The release included a configuration wizard, as well as email Encryption.

Ipswitch Analytics was released in 2015 to monitor and report data through the MOVEit software. The analytic data includes an activity monitor and automated report creation. Ipswitch Analytics can access data from MOVEit file transfer and automation servers. That same year, Ipswitch Failover was released. The software can return recovery point objectives (RPO) in seconds with a recovery time objectives (RTO) of less than a minute, which increases the availability of MOVEit.

References 

File transfer protocols
Managed file transfer